Thomas Banks Cabaniss (August 31, 1835 – August 14, 1915) was a United States representative from Georgia.

Biography
Born in Forsyth, Georgia, he attended private schools and Penfield College (now Mercer University), graduated from the University of Georgia in 1853, studied law, and was admitted to the bar in 1861.

He entered the Confederate States Army on April 1, 1861, and served throughout the Civil War, after which he returned to Forsyth and commenced the practice of law.

He was a member of the Georgia House of Representatives from 1865 to 1867 and was appointed assistant secretary of the Georgia State Senate in 1870 and secretary in 1873. He resigned to become Solicitor General of the Flint circuit, which office he held until 1877; he served in the Georgia Senate from 1878 to 1880 and 1884 to 1886.

Cabaniss was elected as a Democrat to the Fifty-third United States Congress, serving from March 4, 1893, to March 3, 1895; he was an unsuccessful candidate for renomination in 1894, and was appointed a member of the Dawes Commission to adjust affairs in the Indian Territory. He was mayor of Forsyth in 1910 and judge of the city court in 1913 and 1914.

He died in Forsyth in 1915; interment was in Forsyth's Oakland Cemetery.

Cabaniss' cousin, Thomas Chipman McRae of Arkansas, was also a U.S. Representative.

References
 Retrieved on 2008-10-19

1835 births
1915 deaths
Confederate States Army soldiers
Democratic Party members of the Georgia House of Representatives
Democratic Party Georgia (U.S. state) state senators
Georgia (U.S. state) state court judges
University of Georgia alumni
Mayors of places in Georgia (U.S. state)
Democratic Party members of the United States House of Representatives from Georgia (U.S. state)
People from Forsyth, Georgia
19th-century American politicians
19th-century American judges